Ishwardi is a railway junction in Bangladesh, situated in the district of Pabna, in the division of Rajshahi.

History
From 1878, the railway route from Kolkata, then called Calcutta, to Siliguri was in two laps. The first lap was a 185 km journey along the Eastern Bengal State Railway from Calcutta Station (later renamed Sealdah) to Damookdeah Ghat on the southern bank of the Padma River, then across the river in a ferry and the second lap of the journey.  A 336 km metre gauge line of the North Bengal Railway linked Saraghat on the northern bank of the Padma to Siliguri. It was during this period that Iswardi came up as a railway station.

The Kolkata-Siliguri main line was converted to broad gauge in stages. The Shakole-Santahar section was converted in 1910–1914, when Hardinge Bridge was under construction. The Hardinge Bridge was opened in 1915.

The Sara-Sirajganj line was constructed by the Sara-Sirajganj Railway Company in 1915–1916.
The problem of two different gauges in two different parts of the country was solved by introducing dual gauge. Second, a  length of broad gauge track from Jamtoil to Parbatpur was to be converted to dual gauge.

References

Railway stations in Pabna District
Railway junction stations in Bangladesh